Bookstore Basketball is an annual outdoor basketball tournament that takes place at the University of Notre Dame. Bookstore Basketball is the largest outdoor five-on-five tournament in the world with over 700 teams participating each year. Since 1995, Bookstore Basketball has devolved its earning to the Notre Dame Alumni Club of Jamaica to raise money for Jumpball, an organization that aims to teach fundamental life-lessons to children of Jamaica through the game of basketball. The tournament’s name, coined by grad student Jimmy Brogan '70, comes from the basketball courts behind the old South Quad Bookstore, now location of the Coleman Morse Center.

The tournament was established in the spring of 1972 by student Fritz Hoefer, who conceived the idea, and Morrissey Hall president Vince Meconi, who implemented the tournament as part of the University's AnTostal, an annual spring celebrations week.  The first incarnation of the games was composed of 53 teams.

Games are played to 21 points and early rounds are self-refereed.  512 teams competed for the 1983 edition, and the Guinness Book of World Records deemed it the largest five-on-five outdoor basketball tournament in the world, and today the number of teams has grown past 700.  Students, faculty, and staff of the University of Notre Dame, Saint Mary's College, and Holy Cross College can participate Bookstore Basketball.  Women compete in the tournament alongside the men, but additionally there is a separate women’s bracket, established in 1978.  Notable members of the administration, faculty, and staff have participated with as much gusto as the students, such as Joe Montana. University President at the time, Rev. Edward Malloy fielded the team All the President’s Men.

Bookstore Basketball is famous for the creativity and potential notoriety of team names and costumes. Crazy team names are always an important feature of Bookstore Basketball.  Usual themes among the names are puns, innuendos, trash-talk, self-deprecation, celebrities, and current events.  Some of the past names included: H1N1 Mixtape Tour: Off the Sneezy, Hoops I Did It Again, 5 Guys Even Dick Vitale Wouldn’t Watch Play Basketball, We’re Short but Slow, Picked Last in Gym Class, Unlike Tiger Our Rebounds Don’t Text Back, Weapons of Mass Seduction, and The High Five.

List of Champions
There have been 49 bookstore basketball open championships since the tournament was established in 1972.  There have also been approximately 37 champions, with the exact number difficult to quantify based on the informality of the participating teams.  The open championship is named so because both women and men are allowed to compete.  In addition to the open championship, a tournament specifically for women was introduced in the 1980s, although the majority of those champions are undocumented.  The tournament was canceled in 2020 because of the COVID-19 pandemic.

References

External links
 Official Website
 Archives

University of Notre Dame